Alonzo Sidney Powell (born December 12, 1964) is a former Major League Baseball outfielder. He batted and threw right-handed.

Powell was the first foreign player in the NPB to capture 3 consecutive batting titles.

Career

Playing career

Minor and Major League Baseball
Powell played under Gary Attell at Aptos Junior High School, where he honed his skills as a catcher. He was signed as an undrafted free agent by the San Francisco Giants in February 1983. He made his major league debut on April 6, with the Montreal Expos. In 1987, Powell played 14 games, had 8 hits and 4 RBI. In , he played for the Seattle Mariners. He had 24 hits in 111 at-bats (a .216 batting average), 3 home runs, and 12 RBI.

Nippon Professional Baseball
Following his major league career, Powell played for seven seasons in Japan. He was just the third player in Central League history, and the first foreign player, to win three straight batting titles, hitting .324, .355, and .340 from 1994 to 1996. Four times NPB Japanese Baseball Best Nine center-fielder 1993 to 1996. He was also a two-time Central League All-Star.

Coaching career
Powell served as the hitting coach of the Double-A Chattanooga Lookouts from - and the manager of the Single-A Dayton Dragons from -. In , he was the Seattle Mariners minor league hitting instructor. For , he was named the hitting coach for the Triple-A Tacoma Rainiers in the Mariners' organization.

On May 9, 2010, the Seattle Mariners announced that Powell would serve as the team's hitting coach, replacing Alan Cockrell. Powell then was hired as the Assistant Hitting Coach for the San Diego Padres on November 17, 2011.

On December 7, 2015, the Houston Astros named Powell as the team's new hitting coach.  On November 2, 2017, he accepted the position of hitting coach for the San Francisco Giants.

On November 18, 2019, it was announced that Powell had become part of former teammate Tsuyoshi Yoda's backroom staff at the Chunichi Dragons.

Personal life
Powell underwent surgery for prostate cancer in January 2018. He later spoke about cancer in Napa.

References

External links
, or Pura Pelota (Venezuelan Winter League)

1964 births
Living people
African-American baseball coaches
African-American baseball players
American expatriate baseball players in Canada
American expatriate baseball players in Japan
American expatriate baseball players in Venezuela
Baseball coaches from California
Baseball players from San Francisco
Calgary Cannons players
Chunichi Dragons players
Clinton Giants players
Colorado Springs Sky Sox players
Columbus Clippers players
Everett Giants players
Great Falls Giants players
Hanshin Tigers players
Houston Astros coaches
Indianapolis Indians players
Jacksonville Expos players
Major League Baseball hitting coaches
Major League Baseball outfielders
Minor league baseball coaches
Minor league baseball managers
Montreal Expos players
Navegantes del Magallanes players
Newark Bears players
Nippon Professional Baseball first basemen
Nippon Professional Baseball outfielders
Portland Beavers players
San Diego Padres coaches
San Francisco Giants coaches
San Jose Bees players
Seattle Mariners coaches
Seattle Mariners players
Syracuse SkyChiefs players
Tigres de Aragua players
West Palm Beach Expos players